Artjom Artjunin (born 24 January 1990) is an Estonian professional footballer who plays as a centre-back for Legion Tallinn.

Career
On 18 June 2018, Artjunin signed a 2-year contract with Bulgarian club Etar.

International career
Artjunin made his international debut for Estonia on 15 November 2013 against Azerbaijan.

Honours
Levadia
Meistriliiga: 2013, 2014
Estonian Cup: 2009–10, 2011–12, 2013–14
Estonian Supercup: 2010, 2013

References

External links

1990 births
Living people
Footballers from Tallinn
Estonian people of Russian descent
Estonian footballers
Estonia youth international footballers
Estonia under-21 international footballers
Estonia international footballers
FCI Levadia U21 players
FCI Levadia Tallinn players
Tartu JK Tammeka players
FC Brașov (1936) players
Miedź Legnica players
JK Tallinna Kalev players
SFC Etar Veliko Tarnovo players
Meistriliiga players
Esiliiga players
Liga I players
I liga players
First Professional Football League (Bulgaria) players
Estonian expatriate footballers
Estonian expatriate sportspeople in Romania
Expatriate footballers in Romania
Estonian expatriate sportspeople in Poland
Expatriate footballers in Poland
Estonian expatriate sportspeople in Bulgaria
Expatriate footballers in Bulgaria
Association football central defenders